The Mellandsvågen Nature Reserve is located on the western part of Skardsøya island in the municipality of Aure in Møre og Romsdal county, Norway. Since 1996, the nature reserve has had the status of a Ramsar site because of its importance for migratory birds.

The area received protection in 1988 "to preserve an important wetland area with its appertaining plant communities, bird life, and other wildlife," according to the conservation regulations. The Mellandsvågen Wildlife Sanctuary, which measures , was created at the same time as a buffer zone in the land and sea area south and west of the nature reserve. The Mellandsvågen Nature Reserve is bordered to the east by the Melland Nature Reserve, which was established in 2002 and measures .

The area consists of the mouth of a fjord, some islands, and a headland. The dominant landscape type is a large, well-developed, and diverse beach meadow community, especially south of Livsneset and around Storholmen. Behind the beach meadows there is damp heath that transitions into a nutrient-poor bog. It has rich and varied vegetation. There are no species on the national red list, but many of them are regionally rare or endangered: herbaceous seepweed (Suaeda maritima), Ray's knotweed (Polygonum oxyspermum subsp. raii), media sandspurry (Spergularia media), and slenderleaf pondweed (Stuckenia filiformis). The area is very important for overwintering waterfowl such as loons, grebes, and ducks.

Amateur ornithologists from Hemne have been carrying out winter counts of birds in the reserve for several years.

References

External links
 Mijlø-direktoratet: Mellandsvågen. Map and description of the nature reserve.
 Miljøverndepartementet. 1987. Mellandsvågen naturreservat med tilgrensande dyrelivsfreding, Aure kommune, Møre og Romsdal fylke. 1:20,000 map of the nature reserve.
 Forskrift om vern av Mellandsvågen naturreservat med tilgrensande dyrelivsfreding, Aure kommune, Møre og Romsdal. 1988.

Nature reserves in Norway
Ramsar sites in Norway
Protected areas of Møre og Romsdal
Aure, Norway
Protected areas established in 1988